Shewanella dokdonensis is a Gram-negative, facultatively anaerobic, non-spore-forming and motile bacterium from the genus of Shewanella which has been isolated from seawater from the Sea of Japan.

References

Alteromonadales
Bacteria described in 2005